Kolin may refer to:

Kolín, a town in the Central Bohemian Region, Czech Republic
Kolín District
Starý Kolín, a municipality and village near Kolín, Czech Republic
Kolin, Louisiana, unincorporated place
Kolin, Montana
Kolin, West Pomeranian Voivodeship, village in north-western Poland
Koleyn, Tehran, also Romanized as Kolīn, a village in Tehran Province, Iran

People
David Kolin (born 1958), American TV and radio personality
Ivo Kolin (1924–2007), Croatian economist, engineer and inventor
Sacha Kolin (1911–1981), (1911–1981), French–American painter
Kolin Dhillon, British property developer
Kolin (Street Fighter), a fictional character

See also
Kollin, a personal name
Colin (disambiguation)